MullenLowe Lintas Group, formerly Lintas, is an Indian advertising marketing communications company. The company is a wholly owned subsidiary of the Interpublic Group (IPG), and is part of the multinational MullenLowe Group. The group is currently headed by Amer Jaleel, group chairman and chief creative officer, and Virat Tandon, group chief executive officer.

As of May 2018, MullenLowe Lintas Group employs approximately 700 people in 14 offices located in eight Indian cities.

History
Lintas (India) company began operating in Mumbai, India in 1969 as the Indian division of the advertising wing of Lever brothers (Lintas being an acronym for Lever International Advertising Services). It worked as a subsidiary of Lintas international which was established in 1899 and was later made a part of Unilever.

During this period, the agency made many popular advertising campaigns under its director Alyque Padamsee.

The agency has trained a number of subsequently successful personalities in the Indian advertising scene.

Up to the 1980s, Lintas, daCunha, HTA (Hindustan Thomson associates), Purnima advertising, Mudra communications, Trikaya Grey  and O&M (Ogilvy and Mather) were among the largest advertising companies in India.

In 2000, the company changed its name to Lowe Lintas following the global merger of IPG networks, Ammirati Puris Lintas and the Lowe Group in November 1999. MullenLowe Lintas Group was then helmed by Prem Mehta, with Executive Creative Directors R. Balki and K. M. Sridhar leading the creative function. At the time, with billings of over $11 billion, MullenLowe Group was ranked as the fourth-largest global agency group worldwide, with offices in 80 countries, while MullenLowe Lintas Group is one of the top three advertising agencies in India by revenue.

In 2007, Lintas India sold the 51% stake it owned in MullenLowe Lintas Group to its international partner, the Interpublic Group (IPG). Since then, the agency has been a part of MullenLowe Group, which in turn is held by the Interpublic Group. MullenLowe Lintas Group has produced India's first television commercial and introduced the discipline of Channel Planning to India. It also has introduced Shyam Benegal, Gerson da Cunha, Rama Bijapurkar, Gautam Rajadhyaksha and Alyque Padamsee.

In May 2015, the multinational company Lowe Worldwide merged with Mullen, a US-based agency to form the MullenLowe Group, which in turn became part of the Interpublic Group of Companies. Headquartered in London, Lowe Worldwide has over 100 offices in 82 countries. In August, the group started Mullen Lintas - a challenger agency in August 2015, and PointNine Lintas now known as Lintas LIVE, a beta version of a full service omni-channel agency in August 2017.

In August 2016, R. Balki, former group chairman, quit advertising and retired from the group.

Business
MullenLowe Lintas Group offers advertising, digital, public relations, strategic design, rural marketing, and video content. Geoff Cottrill is the president of American operations.

References

External links
 MullenLowe Lintas Group, Official website
 Lowe Lintas news at Business Standard
 Lowe Lintas news at Business Service
Digital marketing companies of India
Interpublic Group
Indian subsidiaries of foreign companies
Companies based in Mumbai
Indian companies established in 1969
Consulting firms established in 1969
1969 establishments in Maharashtra